Lottia antillarum is a species of limpet in the family Lottiidae. It is commonly known as the Antilles limpet.

Distribution
This marine species occurs in the Gulf of Mexico, in the Caribbean Sea, and off the Lesser Antilles.

Description
The size of the shell varies between 10 mm and 28 mm.

References

 Nakano T. & Ozawa T. (2007). Worldwide phylogeography of limpets of the order Patellogastropoda: molecular, morphological and paleontological evidence. Journal of Molluscan Studies 73(1): 79–99.

Lottiidae
Gastropods described in 1834